Fader Label is an independent record label based in New York City that has released albums by Slayyyter, Clairo, Matt and Kim, Yuna, Neon Indian, and more. It was founded in 2002 by Rob Stone and Jon Cohen.

History 

Fader Label was founded in 2002 by Rob Stone and Jon Cohen. In January 2016 the label established a distribution deal with Caroline Distribution, an independent service and distribution division of Capitol Music Group.

In October 2019, the label officially announced the expansion of its staff, marking the largest team in its 17-year history, as well as new additions to its artist roster.

Releases 

Marginalia (EP) – ella jane (2022) 
THIS IS NOT WHAT IT LOOKS LIKE! (EP) – ella jane (2021)
Tendency to be a Loner – Zachary Knowles (2021)
Troubled Paradise – Slayyyter (2021)
Over This! – Slayyyter (2021)
Clouds – Slayyyter (2021)
Troubled Paradise (single) – Slayyyter (2021)
Throatzillaaa – Slayyyter (2020)
Self Destruct – Slayyyter (2020)
August – Lewis Del Mar (2020)
Immunity – Clairo (2019)
Almost Everyday – Matt and Kim (2018)
diary 001 (EP) – Clairo (2018)
We Were the Weirdos – Matt and Kim (2016)
Lightning – Matt and Kim (2012)
Yuna – Yuna (2012)
Decorate (EP) – Yuna (2011)
Sidewalks – Matt and Kim (2010)
In This Light and on This Evening – Editors (2009)
Grand – Matt and Kim (2009)
From the Mountain to the Sea – Birdmonster (2008)
The Inevitable Rise and Liberation of NiggyTardust! – Saul Williams (2007)

Current artists 
Lewis Del Mar
Clairo
Matt and Kim
Jiubel
Charlie Burg
Super Duper
Fractures
Slayyyter
James Ivy
Ella Jane

Catalog artists 
Neon Indian
Yuna
Saul Williams
The Bots
Alan Vega
Editors
The Cool Kids

References

External links 
 

American record labels
Companies based in New York City
2002 establishments in New York City